Ni'mat Allah al-Harawi (also known as Niamatullah) was a chronicler at the court of the Mughal Emperor Jahangir where he compiled a Persian history of the Afghans, the Makhzan-i-Afghani. Its translated copies appear as The History of the Afghans.

The original material for the book was provided by Haibat Khan of Samana, under whose patronage Nimatullah made the compilation c. 1612. The original material was later published separately as Tarikh-i-Khan Jahani Makhzan-i-Afghani. The first part of both books are the same, but the later part contains an additional history of Khan Jehan Lodhi.

The material is part fictional, part historical. The book is a major source of tradition relating to the origins of the Pashtun. It also covers Pashtun rulers in Bengal, contemporary events, and Pashtun hagiography. It plays a large part in various theories which have been offered about the possibility that the Pashtun people are descended from the Israelites, through the Ten Lost Tribes.

Origin theories

The Bani-Israelite theory about the origin of the Pashtuns is based on Pashtun oral traditions; the tradition itself was documented in the Makhzan-i-Afghani, which is the only written source addressing Pashtun origins. The Makhzan traces the Pashtuns' origins from the Patriarch Abraham down to a king named King Talut (Saul). Makhzan to this point agrees with testimony provided by Muslim sources or Hebrew Scriptures, showing King Saul around B.C. 1092 in Palestine. It is beyond this point that the description comes under serious doubt.

Pashtun ancestry

According to Nimat Allah, Qais was the ancestor of most of the existing Pashtun tribes. He met Muhammad and embraced Islam, receiving the Muslim name of Abdur Rashid.  He had three sons, Ghourghusht, Sarban and Bitan (Baitan) and (Karlan) Karlāṇī, his fourth and adopted son.

English translations
A translation appeared in 1836 by Bernhard Dorn which had two parts. There is another partial translation from 1958, Nirodbhusan Roy titled, Niamatullah's History of the Afghans. A translation in two volumes by S. M. Imamuddin appeared in Dhaka, 1960–62.

See also
 Assyrian captivity
 History of ancient Israel and Judah

References

External links
History of the Afghans, Volume 1 (Oriental Translation-Fund, 1829)
Nikmat Allah

History of Pakistan
Pashtun society
17th-century Indian historians
Historians of Afghanistan
Ten Lost Tribes